The Declaratio Ferdinandei was a clause in the Peace of Augsburg, signed in 1555 to end conflicts between Catholics and Protestants within the Holy Roman Empire. The Peace created the principle of Cuius regio, eius religio (Latin for "whose realm, his religion"), which meant that the religion of the ruler decided the religion of the inhabitants. The Declaratio Ferdinandei exempted knights and some of the cities under the jurisdiction of an ecclesiastical prince if they had practiced Lutheranism for some time (Lutheranism was the only branch of Protestantism recognized under the Peace). The provision was not publicized as part of the treaty, and was kept secret for almost two decades.

After Catholic victories early in the Thirty Years' War, the Declaratio Ferdinandei was overturned in the Edict of Restitution of 1629, which was part of Ferdinand II's master plan to reconvert the Holy Roman Empire to Catholicism. The overturning of the Declaratio Ferdinandei and other religious persecution helped rekindle the Thirty Years' War, changing it from an internal conflict within the Holy Roman Empire into an international religious war.

References

See also
 Peace of Augsburg
 Reservatum ecclesiasticum

Augsburg
Latin words and phrases
Augsburg
Christianity in the Holy Roman Empire
1555 establishments in the Holy Roman Empire
1629 disestablishments in the Holy Roman Empire
1555 in Christianity
1555 treaties